Hell House LLC is a 2015 American found-footage horror film written and directed by Stephen Cognetti and produced by Fbi Films. The film, shot as a documentary, follows a group of Halloween haunted house creators as they prepare for the 2009 opening of their popular haunted attraction, Hell House. Tragedy strikes on opening night when an unknown "malfunction" causes the death of 15 tour-goers and staff. The film reveals the lead-up to the tragedy and documenting what exactly went wrong that night which has been a mystery to the public. The film was released on a number of video on-demand platforms, including Amazon Video, Shudder, YouTube, Vudu, and iTunes, on November 1, 2016.

A sequel, Hell House LLC II: The Abaddon Hotel, was released exclusively on Shudder on September 20, 2018. A second sequel, Hell House LLC III: Lake of Fire was released in September 2019.

Plot
The film is presented as a documentary investigating a tragic, unexplained accident at a haunted house. The titular company opened their last attraction  in an abandoned hotel in the small town of Abaddon in Rockland County, New York. On its first night open, something happened which left fifteen tour-goers and all but one staff member dead. Authorities have since only said that an "unknown malfunction" occurred that resulted in their deaths.

The documentary crew, led by producer Diane Graves, interview people familiar with the case, including a journalist who broke into the hotel a few years after the incident, taking photos which fanned rumours of something supernatural behind the tragedy. The crew manages to track down the sole surviving member of the Hell House staff, Sara Havel, who provides them with footage shot in the lead up to the tragedy.

Havel's tapes document the crew's arrival at the dilapidated Abaddon Hotel, where they go to work setting it up for Halloween. Each begins to experience unexplainable events but Alex, the CEO of the company, is determined to press on. The footage details the paranormal forces behind the deaths, implying the hotel may previously have been the site of a Satanic cult.

Sara asks for a break from filming, and tells Diane she will be in her hotel room if the team have more questions. She also suggests the crew should break into the Abaddon to see for themselves what happened inside. Mitchell, a member of the documentary film crew, stays behind to catalogue Sara's footage. He sees something that deeply disturbs him, but is hidden from the audience, and tries to call Diane but cannot get through. Meanwhile, Diane and her cameraman break in and see the aftermath of what unfolded that night. They go to the second floor, where they see a room labeled '2C', the same room Sara said she was staying in. When they enter the room, they find Sara sitting with her back to them. Diane and her cameraman try to flee but are attacked by Sara and other ghostly figures.

It is revealed that what Mitchell saw while cataloging the tapes was a possessed member of the Hell House staff killing Sara; she has been dead the whole time they had been speaking to her, and there were, in fact, no survivors.

Production
In 2011, the film's executive producers asked for a script revolving around a haunted attraction gone wrong. After many rewrites, the script was locked by late 2013. Casting took place in New York City in February 2014, and production took place shortly after, in May. Initially, the filmmakers were in search of an abandoned house to shoot the film in, as the original script had the events taking place in a house. As early as 2012, the director had been visiting many abandoned buildings and homes, including two in the New York county where the story takes place, Rockland County, New York. After not finding anything suitable, they instead began searching for real haunted house attractions to shoot in. They found the haunted attraction called the Haunting at the Waldorf Hotel in Lehighton, Pennsylvania, run by Angie Moyer, who served as the film's set designer. The script had to be changed in a few areas to reflect the change in setting.

After filming wrapped within Lehighton in May, the production then moved to New York City, where most of the interviews were filmed. In mid-June, filming was complete, and the movie went to post-production, where it would be edited for the next five months, before the first private screening of a rough cut would be seen in the Rose Studio at the Lincoln Center for the Performing Arts.

After a few more rounds of re-cuts, the film was locked just before its first public screening at the Telluride Horror Show in October 2015. The film would also screen at Fear Fete Film Festival the same week, where it won the best paranormal film award. The worldwide distribution rights for Hell House LLC were acquired by Terror Films, with a North American VOD release date of November 1, 2016.

Cast
 Ryan Jennifer Jones as Sara Havel
 Danny Bellini as Alex Taylor
 Gore Abrams as Paul O'Keefe
 Jared Hacker as Tony Prescott
 Adam Schneider as Andrew “Mac” McNamara
 Alice Bahlke as Diane Graves
 Phil Hess as Joey
 Lauren A Kennedy as Melissa
 Jeb Kreager as Martin Cliver

Reception
Review aggregator Rotten Tomatoes gives Hell House LLC a 89% positive rating based on nine critic reviews, with an average rating of 7.75/10. Dread Central gave the film a positive review, awarding it a score of 3.4/5. Found Footage Critic praised the cast, premise, and cinematography, giving the film a rating of 7.8 of 10. The Horror Society gave a score of 8.75 out of 10 and saying the mystery and suspense works for this film. 
SlashFilm also gave the film a positive review writing that "Stephen Cognetti's Halloween chiller marries found footage with haunted attractions, channeling a popular and rational fear." Luke Rodriguez of Modern Horror was more critical of the film, saying that "it doesn't quite stick the landing", but otherwise enjoyed the film.

Sequels 
In an interview with Geeks of Doom Cognetti has stated that he sees the Hell House LLC trilogy as "one movie just divided into three acts and each movie is its own act". He further commented that he found it easy to write the second and third parts, as he knew "where I wanted to go with it from the get-go".

Hell House LLC II: The Abaddon Hotel

Hell House LLC II: The Abaddon Hotel was released on Shudder on September 20, 2018. The film's plot centers around a group of journalists who have gathered to explore the Abaddon Hotel, which has once again been abandoned following the events of the prior film. The movie further fleshes out the character of Andrew Tully, a character introduced in the first film, and his goal of opening a gate to hell. None of the journalists leave the abandoned hotel alive. The sole survivor found by the police is revealed to have been dead all along and sent out to intrigue people into visiting the hotel.

Bloody Disgusting reviewed the film, criticizing it as a "well-intentioned misstep".

Hell House LLC III: Lake of Fire
Hell House LLC III: Lake of Fire was released as a Shudder exclusive on September 19, 2019. The film is styled as a documentary following Russell Wynn, a wealthy and mysterious entrepreneur who wants the Abaddon Hotel to serve as the location for an immersive theater experience called "Insomnia" based on Faust. Although aware of the location's history, he is keen to proceed with the venture despite others warning him of ongoing and frightening supernatural events. This prompts the documentary team to investigate Russell's past and the prior two events, uncovering new footage that implies Russell was involved with or was monitoring events. When opening night arrives chaos ensues. However, Russell manages to wrestle Tully and overcome him before he can kill or take any other innocent lives. The following day one of the documentary crew muses that Russell was likely an angel sent back to defeat Tully and bring an end to his evil plans. Before the film ends, Russell manages to bring back the spirits of the original crew who died in the house, telling them that they are free from the evil but that the house still holds them captive. The song "Running Away" by the Pittsburgh based band "Post Traumatik" was used during the bar scene.

Film School Rejects was critical of the movie, stating that it was "an ambitious stab at closing out a horror trilogy, but as much as that’s an accomplishment worth celebrating the end result is an unfortunate disappointment. Still, fans of the first two — or even the first one — might find some worthwhile closure in the final swan song of the Abaddon Hotel." The film holds a rating of 14% on Rotten Tomatoes, based on 7 reviews.

References

External links
 
 

2015 horror films
American supernatural horror films
2015 films
Found footage films
Halloween horror films
2010s English-language films
2010s American films